Norbergs BK is a soccer club in Norberg, Sweden, established in 1914 as Norbergs AIF before changing name in 1985.

The women's soccer team played in the Swedish top division in 1981 and 1982. and the men's soccer team played in the Swedish third division in 1976.

References

External links
 Norbergs BK 

Football clubs in Västmanland County
Sport in Västmanland County
Association football clubs established in 1914
1914 establishments in Sweden